Equal-to-apostles or equal-to-the-apostles (muʿādil ar-rusul; ; ; , ravnoapostol'nyj; Bulgarian and Serbian: , ravnoapostolni; ; Ukrainian: рівноапостольний) is a special title given to some saints in Eastern Orthodoxy and in Byzantine Catholicism. The title is bestowed as a recognition of these saints' outstanding service in the spreading and assertion of Christianity, comparable to that of the original apostles.

Examples
Below is a partial list of saints who are called equal-to-the-apostles:
Mary Magdalene (1st century)
Photine, the Samaritan woman at the well (1st century)
Thekla (1st century)
Saint Apphia (1st century)
Abercius of Hieropolis (2nd century)
Helena of Constantinople (c. 250 – c. 330)
Constantine the Great (c. 272 – 337)
Nino (c. 296 – c. 338 or 340), baptizer of the Georgians
Mirian III of Iberia (died 361), first Christian Georgian monarch
Nana of Iberia (4th century)
Patrick of Ireland (5th century)
Photios I of Constantinople
Cyril (827 – 869)
Rastislav of Moravia (870)
Methodius (815 – 885)
Saint Angelar (died after 885 AD)
Saint Gorazd (9th century)
Boris I of Bulgaria (died 907)
Saint Naum (died 910) 
Clement of Ohrid (died 916)
Saint Sava (1169 or 1174 – 1236)
Olga of Kiev (c. 890 – 969)
Vladimir the Great (c. 958 – 1015)
Saint Olaf of Norway (c. 995 – 1030), baptiser of Norway
Stephen I of Hungary (969 – 1038)
Cosmas of Aetolia (1714 – 1779)
Innocent of Alaska (1797 – 1879)
Nicholas of Japan (1836 – 1912)

Other usages of the term

Political
As George Ostrogorsky relates, the insistence of pre-Christian Roman emperors on being
worshipped as gods had always been a fundamental stumbling block for early Christians (see Anti-Christian policies in the Roman Empire).  Nevertheless, even with the advent of
Christian emperors, of which Constantine the Great was the first, the sovereign's power maintained a distinctly divine flavour.
Indeed, to use Ostrogorsky's more strongly worded phrasing, "the Roman-Hellenistic cult of the sovereign lived on in the Christian Byzantine empire 
in all its ancient glory."
The Greek term for "Equal-to-the-Apostles", isapóstolos, was used in the late Roman/Byzantine empire to contribute to this divine imperial image.
Constantine himself seems to have had this in mind when, according to Eusebius of Caesarea, he designed the Church of the Holy Apostles to be his tomb in Constantinople:

Symbolism aside, modern scholars offer differing accounts as to whether Eusebius ever used the actual title of isapóstolos in reference to Constantine.  John Julius Norwich maintains that "for the last few years of his life, Constantine had regularly used the title isapóstolos", though he does not cite a primary source.  The New Catholic Encyclopedia (supplement 2010) states that Eusebius did refer to Constantine with this title, although it too does not cite a primary source.  Aidan Nichols also shares this view, positing that Eusebius did indeed describe Constantine as isapóstolos, but that a later editor, or "interpolator," had reduced his status to isepiskopos—Equal-to-a-Bishop—so as to make Constantine seem more modest.  In contrast to this, Jonathan Bardill states rather bluntly that our sources do not directly speak of Constantine as an equal of the apostles until the 5th century (that is, after Eusebius).

This characterization was not without its problems, however.  As alluded to above, though Constantine himself may very much have intended to be recognized as isapóstolos, many theologians and churchmen were made uneasy at this prospect.  As Gilbert Dagron explains, the difficulty was not necessarily that Constantine was unworthy (merely immodest, more like), but rather that the title resulted in a very ambiguous mixing of church and state.  Thus when Sozomen deals with Constantine's funeral in his ecclesiastical history, he makes a point of saying that bishops were afterwards interred in the same place, "for the hierarchical dignity is not only equal in honor to imperial power, but, in sacred places, even takes the ascendancy."

In time, however, the soon to be sainted Constantine would nevertheless become firmly established as isapóstolos, being enshrined as such in the Bibliotheca Hagiographica Graeca and other Byzantine literature (ex. Anna Komnene confidently calls him the 13th apostle in the Alexiad, to whom she likens her father Alexius). Indeed, in this capacity he proved to be an irresistible model for many later Byzantine rulers, who would regularly make use of the title isapóstolos themselves—for political—as well as religious reasons.

References

Groups of Eastern Orthodox saints
Types of saints
Christian terminology